Scoliacma fuscofascia is a moth in the family Erebidae. It was described by Walter Rothschild in 1913. It is found in Papua New Guinea, where it is restricted to the Central Mountain Range.

References

External links

Moths described in 1913
Lithosiina